The tournament has begun the January 3rd and will give two places in the Copa Libertadores 2007. Eight teams participate in this tournament

Groups

Group A

Group B

Match schedule
Matches at Robertson Stadium (Houston, Texas)

Matches at Pizza Hut Park (Frisco, Texas)

Matches at The Home Depot Center (Carson, California)

External links
Official site (in Spanish and English)

Interliga
Inter